is a government simulation video game released by Hector Playing Interface for the Famicom in 1988. It is loosely based on the 1988 election campaign for the president of the United States and features characters based on actual candidates and other politicians. The game was conceived and directed by Japanese politician Shintaro Ito and a newscaster for CNN Daywatch.

Gameplay
At the start of the game, the player has four different issues to take either a liberal, conservative, or centrist position on. The player must make wise use of his funds as he is trying to become the President of the United States of America. Being liberal offends the religious folks, being conservative offends the university students and working class voters, and being centrist (as in pleasing everybody) actually pleases nobody. The player starts in February 1988 at a convention for his political party somewhere in the Midwestern United States. and must work his way up to the final election results on November 1988 without becoming bankrupt.

In the presently unknown primary election, candidates in five states (including players) make the final selection along with the decision-making. Opinion polls and election campaigns (speeches) do benefit the player in his presidential campaign. However, the primary elections in are not implemented in all states in the same way. Some states may be processed automatically by computer (a fixed number of delegate count) while others in a more manual way. The Super Tuesday primaries are to be held on the same day in many states, ballot counting is done after the player has made simultaneous attempts in each campaign state into three regions. After that, the primary election is made (not counting district units held, subject to the provisions of the delegate count.)

The priorities of the policies that the player can make were introduced to the game as the situation was in 1988 because of the Soviet Union and the CoCom. In 1991, the dissolution of the Soviet Union would eventually lead to CoCom being disbanded in 1994. South Africa had an apartheid regime at the time and abolished in it 1991. The Panama Canal Zone was returned in 1999 to the people of Panama. However, it differs from the political situation encountered in the game. The "AIDS patient isolation" issue was showing an event of discriminatory policy of an era that had not shown wide public awareness about how the AIDS virus manages to spread from person to person.

If the player manages to win the game and become President of the United States, the official Presidential Oath is displayed in English.

Issues

Environmental issues
 Development of the nation's resources
 Nuclear power generation
 Air pollution prevention method
 Civil rights movement
 Restriction of the immigrant worker
 Firearms regulations
 Isolation of AIDS

Defense issues
 Reduction of the defense budget
 Reinforcement of military power
 Strategy science arms reduction
 Prohibition of nuclear tests
 Plans to create the Star Wars program
 To support the Government of Nicaragua
 Freezing the deployment of nuclear weapons
 Mutual (Soviet-American) reduction of defense power

Education and social issues
 Revival of a Christian morality
 Obligation of service in the public school system
 Patriotic education
 Abolition of the mandatory bussing system
 Pornography regulation
 Artificial abortion ban
 Improving the environment

Diplomatic issues
 Car import restrictions
 Punishment to the apartheid regime of South Africa
 Sanctions on Iran
 CoCom regulations
 Assistance to the anti-communist nations
 Panama Canal restoration
 Relations with the People's Republic of China
 Imposing duties on imported oil

Issues concerning Japan
 Japanese car import restrictions
 Dumping sanctions of Japanese products
 Agricultural import liberalization demand
 New comprehensive trade bill
 Improving customs duties, import charges
 Prohibition of commercial whaling
 Advancement of the Japanese capital system
 Enhancing Japanese defence

Characters

Playable candidates
The player can choose to be one of six candidates: three Republicans and three Democrats. Four of the candidates are based on actual politicians who ran for the 1988 U.S. presidential elections, but with slightly altered names, while two of them are fictional characters modeled after foreign (non-U.S.) politicians.
Push
A Republican candidate based on George H. W. Bush, who went on to win the actual 1988 elections. He's the current U.S. Vice President like his real-life counterpart at the time. Push is a moderate WASP from Texas who believes in free trade.
Thutcher
A fictional Republican candidate modeled after Margaret Thatcher. Nicknamed the "iron lady", she's a conservative senator from Michigan who opposes the Japanese takeover of corporate America.
Roberts
A Republican candidate based on Pat Robertson. A television evangelist who is very arch-conservative and anti-communist. He is a member of the New Light Christian faction.
Dakakis
A Democratic candidate based on Michael Dukakis. An underdog who would provide a challenge for an expert player to get to office.
Zeckson
A Democratic candidate based on Jesse Jackson. A religious politician who vows to bring back Christian values to America.
Suzuki
A fictional Democratic candidate modeled after Noboru Takeshita. The son of Japanese immigrants, he's a senator from California currently employed by the Department of Agriculture.

Rival candidates
These candidates cannot be selected, but instead appear as political rivals for the player's chosen character.
Dall
A Republican candidate based on Bob Dole.
Sanderson
A Republican candidate.
Roeder
A fictional Democratic candidate modeled after Gerhard Schröder.
Core
A Democratic candidate based on Al Gore with high approval ratings.

Staff
After choosing a candidate, the player must then choose one of the following characters to be the candidate's assistant and provide his or her expertise into the campaign.
 Alan
 A former agency worker who specializes in marketing research and promises to deliver a strong campaign for the player.
 Virgil
 A former newscaster who is always on duty.
 Scott
 A former State Department worker who is influential in public life.
 Penelope
 A TV correspondent with proficiency in five different languages.

References

1988 video games
Hect games
Japan-exclusive video games
Nintendo Entertainment System games
Nintendo Entertainment System-only games
Social simulation video games
Video games developed in Japan
Video games set in 1988
Video games set in the United States